The 1871 Canadian census marked the first regularly scheduled collection of national statistics of the Canadian population on April 2, 1871,  as required by section 8 of the British North America Act. The constitution required a census to be taken in 1871 and every tenth year thereafter. Parliament implemented the requirements of the constitution through the Census Act of May 12, 1870. In the first census, the population of Canada was enumerated to be 3,485,761.

All inhabitants of Canada were included, including aboriginals. While this was the first national census of Canada, only four provinces existed at the time: Ontario, Quebec, New Brunswick, and Nova Scotia. Other areas of what later became part of Canada continued to be enumerated in their own separate censuses. The results of the 1871 census, in both English and French, were reported in a five volume set.

The following census was the 1881 census.

Questionnaire
The questionnaire was on a variety of subjects and asked 211 questions including area, land holdings, vital statistics, religion, education, administration, the military, justice, agriculture, commerce, industry and finance. Information was collected in tabular form on population, houses and other buildings, lands, industries and institutions. The population section included the age, sex, religion, education, race and occupation of each person, although not every household answered all 211 questions.

Data products 

As the data were compiled, Statistics Canada released various census data products.

Population by province
Population of the provinces and territories:

Manitoba and North-West Territories joined the Canadian confederation on July 15, 1870, but were not included in the 1871 official census of Canada. In addition, British Columbia joined the Canadian confederation on July 20, 1871, after the census date of April 2, 1871. Statistics Canada has included estimates for all three of these jurisdictionstotal population onlyin the same stated source, though totals do not add (see notes at source). Statistics Canada also provides the 1871 totals by sex for Canada, adjusted with their estimates for Manitoba and North-West Territories and British Columbia.

Religion

Origins
The figures for 1871 are for the four original provinces (Ontario, Quebec, New Brunswick, Nova Scotia) only.

See also
 Census in Canada
 Canadians
 United States census

References

Census
Censuses in Canada
Canada